NOV, or News Overview, is a widely deployed indexing method for Usenet articles, also found in some Internet email implementations. Written in 1992 by Geoff Collyer, NOV replaced a variety of incompatible indexing schemes used in different client programs, each typically requiring custom modifications to each news server before they could be used.

Operation
In its original implementation, the header lines of each incoming message are examined, and a single line of text is appended to the overview files, with one overview file present for each newsgroup. Tab (ASCII code 9) characters and line breaks within the headers are converted to spaces (ASCII code 32), and the header fields within each overview line are then delimited by tab characters.

The first seven fields in a NOV line are fixed and unlabeled:
Subject: header contents
From: header contents
Date: header contents
Message-ID: header contents
References: header contents
Size of the article in octets
Lines: header contents

The header lines are those defined in either RFC 2822 or RFC 1036. If data for any of these fields is missing, a tab alone is put in its place. The value of the size field is approximate, as servers may count line endings as one or two characters. Additionally, the lines value may be calculated by the server, supplied by the message sender, or omitted altogether.

An arbitrary number of additional fields may be added to any NOV line.  The eighth and later fields must be labeled in the form "Header-Name: contents", again delimited by tabs.  The order and presence of additional fields are allowed to vary from line to line, and from server to server.  Some server provide a schema of what is recorded to new overview lines in the form of an NNTP  command, but this cannot be relied upon to be accurate for older entries.

In practice, most servers supply only one optional field, the contents of the Xref: header, to allow crosspost management.

Variations
While virtually all modern news server and newsreader software employs NOV, it has also found its way into other applications such as email clients. One prominent example is Gnus, which can take advantage of overview files for faster access to large mail folders.

Many newer news servers store NOV data in a variety of formats.  A specialized database is frequently used in favor of the original flat file arrangement.

External links
Original NOV software distribution (mirror at Funet, formerly hosted at ftp.std.com)
RFC 2980 describes the  command.

Usenet